The 1981 Colgate Red Raiders football team was an American football team that represented Colgate University as an independent during the 1981 NCAA Division I-A football season. In its sixth season under head coach Frederick Dunlap, the team compiled a 7–3 record. Karl Grabowski and Tom McChesney were the team captains. 

This would be Colgate's final season in the NCAA's top level of competition. Shortly after the season ended, the NCAA reassigned the Red Raiders, along with the Ivy League and several other football teams, to Division I-AA, now known as the Football Championship Subdivision.

The team played its home games at Andy Kerr Stadium in Hamilton, New York.

Schedule

Leading players 
Two trophies were awarded to the Red Raiders' most valuable players in 1981: 
 Tom Rogers, wide receiver, received the Andy Kerr Trophy, awarded to the most valuable offensive player.
 Kelly Robinson, defensive end, received the Hal W. Lahar Trophy, awarded to the most valuable defensive player.

Statistical leaders for the 1981 Red Raiders included: 
 Rushing: Rich Erenberg, 575 yards and 4 touchdowns on 142 attempts
 Passing: Steve Calabria, 1,620 yards, 121 completions and 11 touchdowns on 230 attempts
 Receiving: Tom Rogers, 768 yards and 4 touchdowns on 52 receptions
 Total offense: Steve Calabria, 1,719 yards (1,620 passing, 99 rushing)
 Scoring: Brian Byrne, 50 points from 26 PATs and 8 field goals
 All-purpose yards: Rich Erenberg, 810 yards (575 rushing, 152 kickoff returning, 47 receiving, 36 punt returning)
 Tackles: Dave Wolf, 150 total tackles
 Sacks: John Joyce, 3.5 quarterback sacks

References

Colgate
Colgate Raiders football seasons
Colgate Red Raiders football